Wola Błędowska may refer to:

Wola Błędowska, Nowy Dwór Mazowiecki County, a Polish village
Wola Błędowska, Ostrołęka County, a Polish village

See also
Wola Błędowa